A real-estate lock box is a padlock-shaped box that generally hangs around the doorknob of a house that is on the market. The device holds the keys to a house to allow communal access for all real estate agents, while continuing to keep them secure. Permission is generally required from the seller, who is the owner, to install such a device on the door. Lock boxes can also be used for the general storage and security of keys for the use of familial access.

Traditional real estate lock boxes are secured either with a manual key, a security code, or a swipe card, while newer versions operate in tandem with mobile devices, incorporating logging and remote control and configuration.

Advances 
New technology allows for computer generated codes to access the keys from a lockbox. When a buyers agent requests to see a property, a computer program will send a one time use code to the agent for a one time entry. This advancement allows for maximum security, and is nearly the equivalent to changing the lock every time a customer leaves. Other locks use mobile apps to grant access upon arrival of the customer.

See also 
 Knox Box—A type of lock box with a similar purpose used by firefighters

References

Containers
Locks (security device)
Real estate
Security technology